Barjeel Art Foundation is a non-profit arts organisation based in Sharjah, United Arab Emirates. The foundation was established in 2010 by Emirati commentator Sultan Sooud Al Qassemi to manage and exhibit his personal art collection. There are over 1,000 pieces of modern and contemporary art in the foundation's art collection. The organisation primarily focuses on artwork produced by Arab artists worldwide and includes paintings, sculptures and installations.

Between 2013 and 2018, the foundation mounted 23 exhibitions in countries including Egypt, UK, Jordan, United States, Kuwait, Singapore, and Iran. In May 2018, a semi-permanent exhibition of the key artworks opened in the Sharjah Art Museum.
[[File:Barjeel Art Foundation - Whitechapel gallery.jpg|thumb|Barjeel's Imperfect Chronology' exhibition at the Whitechapel Gallery in London|alt=]]

History

The etymology of Barjeel is derived from the Arabic word for wind tower. Al-Qassemi started collecting art in 2002 and planned on eventually making the collection available to the public. In 2010, the foundation began exhibiting its collection in an arts space in the Al Qasba district in central Sharjah. In May 2018, the collection moved to a long-term exhibit at the Sharjah Art Museum.

Collaborations and initiatives
Barjeel Art Foundation has lent artworks to institutions for exhibition including the Mori Art Museum in Tokyo, the Whitechapel Gallery, in England, Sharjah Museum of Islamic Civilization in the UAE, and Casa Arabe, Cordoba, Spain.

The first external collaboration for the foundation was the 2013 exhibition 'Terms & Conditions' in Singapore. The Singapore Art Museum borrowed half of the art pieces for the exhibition from Barjeel and the other half from the National Museum of the History of Immigration in Paris and the Arab Museum of Modern Art in Doha. In 2015, Barjeel opened the first-ever showcase of political Arab art in North America at the Aga Khan Museum in Toronto. The exhibit, titled '''Home Ground', featured 24 works by 12 different Arab artists, including paintings, sculptures, and photographs.

Since May 2018, the Barjeel Art Foundation collection has been in display at the Sharjah Art Museum through an agreement between the foundation and the Sharjah Museums Authority. The long-term exhibition will last until May 2023 and hosts a selection of modernist paintings and sculptures from the foundation's collection, including works by Saloua Raouda Choucair, Kadhim Hayder, and Dia Azzawi. The exhibition provides access to scholars and researchers to study the art pieces on display.

In January 2020, 75 pieces from Barjeel's modern abstract art collection will go on a 2-year-long touring exhibition in the United States. The exhibition, titled Taking Shape: Abstractions from the Arab World 1950s-1980s''', will rotate between the Grey Art Gallery and the Johnson Museum of Art in New York, the Block Museum of Art in Illinois, the McMullen Museum of Art in Massachusetts, and the University of Michigan Museum of Art.

The foundation's education initiatives include the Barjeel Global Fellowship with the Museum of Contemporary Art in Chicago. The foundation has organised forums such as Abstraction Unframed: Fourth Annual Conference of the Association for Modern and Contemporary Art of the Arab World, Turkey, and Iran (AMCA). Barjeel has released a series of publications on Arab art and its history.

Exhibitions

In-house exhibitions

External exhibitions

Gallery

See also
Sharjah Art Museum
Sharjah Museums Authority
Sultan Sooud Al-Qassemi

References 

Arts organizations established in 2010
2010 establishments in the United Arab Emirates
Organisations based in Sharjah (city)